Deadly Strike, also known in the West as Breakout from Oppression, is a 1978 Hong Kong martial arts action film directed Lau Kar-leung and his adopted brother Gordon Liu, the latter helming his directorial debut. The film stars Liu alongside Dean Shek.

Plot
To Tsao-chan is a warlord who risked his life to escape from the army. He rushes home and outside his house he sees three men running for the door. To hurried into his house and sees his mother and ten-year-old sister killed while his older sister is also injured. His neighbor Siu Sam-chi's right eye was also wounded. Then the dying Sam interprets the incident to To that three thieves passed by and was fascinated by the beauty of To's sister and then proceeded to gang rape her, while his mother and younger sister was yelling and the thieves killed the two. Sam tries to come by to help but was injured by the thieves. Sam dies after finishing his last sentence. To has a strong heart and have concluded who the murderer is.

In town, a mean man named Au San-yeh owns a firework factory who treats his workers as slaves while not paying them fairly. To avenge his family, To pretends to help Au against the Cheung brothers who always opposes him. After big fights, To later found out the murderer was actually Sam.

Cast
Dean Shek as Cheung Tsai
Gordon Liu as To Tsao-chan
Paul Chun as Cheung Chiu-ming
Maggie Li as Hsiu Tsui
Fung Hark-on as Au San-yeh
Ho Kei-cheong as Chung Ting-fu
Wong Chu-tong as Worker hired to blow up To
Lam Lau as blind mother
Lo Wai as Police chief
Lau Chun-fai as Police constable
Chui Chung-hok as murder victim
Chan Keung as San Yeh's thug, follows Tu
Huang Ha as Yai Man, San-yeh's thug
Chik Ngai-hung as San-yeh's thug
Chui Fat as San-yeh's thug
Ho Po-sing as San-yeh's thug
Law Keung as San-yeh's thug
Chan Dik-hak as San-yeh's thug
Yam Sai-kwoon as San-yeh's thug
Yang Chi-fun
Shut Wing-chong
Ho Bing
San Sing as angry worker
Tam Po
Lai Yan
Jane Kwan

Box office
The film grossed HK$44,954.40 at the Hong Kong box office during its theatrical run from 17 to 20 June 1978 in Hong Kong.

External links

Deadly Strike at Hong Kong Cinemagic

1978 films
1978 martial arts films
1970s action thriller films
1970s martial arts films
Hong Kong action thriller films
Hong Kong martial arts films
Kung fu films
1970s Cantonese-language films
Films directed by Lau Kar-leung
Hong Kong films about revenge
1978 directorial debut films
1970s Hong Kong films